‘Izz al-Dīn ‘Abu Hamīd ‘Abd al-Hamīd bin Hībat-Allah ibn Abi al-Hadīd al Mutazilī al-Mada'ini, also known as Ibn abi'l-Hadid (30 December 1190 – June 1258; 586–656 AH), was a Shafe'i Mutazili scholar and writer during the Middle Ages. He studied under Abu'l-Khayr Musaddiq ibn Shabib al-Wasiti (died AD 1208/605 AH) and is best known for his commentary on the Nahj al-Balagha, which he titled Sharh Nahj al-Balagha.

Birth 
Ibn Abi'l-Hadid was born on Sunday, 1st Zulhijja, 586 AH/  30 December 1190 AD in the city of al-Mada'in, now Salman Pak, Baghdad Governorate, Iran.

Views 
Regarding the fabrications of Hadiths, he said that lies had been introduced into the hadith collections of Shi'ites in order to favour their Imam, Ali, or due to their enmity with other religious groups. Regarding the early Caliphate, Al-Hadid explains Ali's position during the early Caliphates in his commentary in his Sharh Nahjul Balagha. According to him Ali did not approve of the Rashidun Caliphate and did not follow them in prayers. Sunni Sihah Sittah are full of lies as well.He further states that he follows the example of Ali and does not go beyond that, going as far as to curse Muaawiyah.

Works
Comments on the Peak of Eloquence; a commentary on the Nahj al-Balagha, a collection of traditions attributed to Ali ibn Abi Talib. A 20-volume edition was published by Muhammad Abu l-Fadl Ibrahim (Cairo: 'Isa al-Babi al-Halabi) between 1959 and 1964.

See also
List of Islamic scholars

References

External links
http://www.al-islam.org/thaqalayn/nontl/Nar4-7.htm

1190 births
1258 deaths
Sunni Muslim scholars of Islam
Mu'tazilites
13th-century people from the Abbasid Caliphate
13th-century Arabic poets
13th-century Muslim scholars of Islam
13th-century jurists
13th-century Arabs